Nidularium ferdinando-coburgii is a plant species in the genus Nidularium. This species is endemic to Brazil.

References

ferdinando-coburgii
Flora of Brazil